The Sigma Sigma–Delta Chi Fraternity House, also known as the Iowa House, is a historic building in Ames, Iowa, United States.  It is a large 2-story brick structure built in 1924.  The building is capped with a hip roof that is intersected by steeply-pitched gables at a lower level.  There are also wide eaves with exposed beams.  A porte-cochère is located on the north side of the building, which is unique feature among the  historic fraternity and sorority houses associated with Iowa State University.  Architecturally, it is a combination of the American Craftsman, Tudor Revival, and classical features.

Sigma Sigma was a local fraternity founded in either 1907 or 1908 at what was then called Iowa State College.  They grew in size and sought to become a national fraternity beginning in the 1920s.  The effort went dormant while they built this building, but they took it up again in the 1930s. They reached nationalization in 1933 when they merged with Delta Chi.  The fraternity remained active at ISU until 2001 when membership declined significantly and it became inactive.  Delta Chi sold the building in 2006 and it was converted into a bed and breakfast.   It was listed on the National Register of Historic Places in 2008.

References

Residential buildings completed in 1924
Buildings and structures in Ames, Iowa
National Register of Historic Places in Story County, Iowa
Residential buildings on the National Register of Historic Places in Iowa
Bed and breakfasts in Iowa
Fraternity and sorority houses